Lokaneethi is a 1952 Indian Malayalam-language film, directed by R. Velappan Nair and produced by Swami Narayanan. The film stars Sathyan and B. S. Saroja. The film had musical score by V. Dakshinamoorthy.

Cast
 Sathyan
 Pankajavalli
 S. P. Pillai
 B. S. Saroja
 Aranmula Ponnamma
 K. K. Subramaniam
 Kumari Rajam
 Kottarakkara Sreedharan Nair
 Nanukkuttan
 Rajasekharan
 Muthukulam Raghavan Pilla
 Kalaikkal Kumaran
 Kumari Thankam
 P. O. Pappankutty Ashan
 Soman
 Jagathy N. K. Achari
 Kanisukumaran
 Madhuri (old)
 Sivarama Pillai
 T. S. Muthaiah
 Mohan (Old)
 Prabha Kumari
 Sreekumari
 K. Ramabhadran Nair

References

External links
 

1952 films
1950s Malayalam-language films